The Ballymun Concrete News was officially launched in October 2001, the Concrete News was a one-man-operated free newspaper that circulated to 20,000 homes on the Northside of Dublin City.  Designed to spread only good news stories about Ballymun, the paper ceased trading in 2006 due to poor advertising revenue, which according to  editor and owner Seamus Kelly was exacerbated by the delay in the delivery of the promised new local shopping centre.

References

Defunct newspapers published in Ireland
Publications established in 2001
Publications disestablished in 2006